Etholen, Texas is a ghost town in Hudspeth County, Texas, allegedly four miles west of Sierra Blanca. Different sources claim different things about when the town was founded, but particularly it was during the 1880s. Etholen never grew to more than a small railroad station on the Southern Pacific Railroad as the population was fewer than 25 by the mid-20th century. Etholen was removed from maps in the 1960s.

References

Ghost towns in West Texas
Geography of Hudspeth County, Texas